The Assessor Bachmann House (Danish: Assessor Bachmanns Gård
) is a historic property located at Gammeltorv 18 in the Old Town of Copenhagen, Denmark. It houses the private equity fund Maj Invest.

History

The property was built in  1796–1797 for Assessor C. Fr. Bachmann, The neighbouring building at No. 16 was also built for C. Fr. Bachmann and his widow Anna Dorothea Bachmann in 1800–1801.

The medical doctor and later vice mayor of Copenahgen Niels Bang and the naval officer Lorentz Fjelderup Lassen both lived in the building in 1802–03. Former bishop and professor of theology N. E. Balle (1744–1816) lived in the building from 1813 to 1816. The politician Anders Sandøe Ørsted (1778–1860) lived in the building from 1837 to 1859.  In the 19th century, the rear wing housed an akvavit distillery.

Brødrene Bendix acquired the building in 1917 and was based in the ground floor of the main building but the last private apartments did not disappear until the 1970s. Danske Vognmænds Arbejdsgiversammenslutning  (now Dansk Transport of Logistik) purchased the building in 1975.

Architecture
The building is designed in the Neoclassical style. The facade is decorated with Ionic order pilasters and a large triangular pediment. A gateway in the left side of the building opens to a long, narrow courtyard. The complex also comprises an 11-nay side wing and a five-bay rear wing at the bottom of the courtyard. It was listed in 1918.

References

External links
 Maj Invest

Listed residential buildings in Copenhagen
Neoclassical architecture in Copenhagen
Residential buildings completed in 1797